Bassam Al-Salhi (born 1960) is a General Secretary of the Palestinian People's Party and elected member of the Palestinian Legislative Council.

He was the party's candidate for President of the Palestinian Authority in 2005.  He received the fewest votes.

He was one of the two deputies elected from The Alternative at the 2006 Palestinian legislative election.

In the 2007 "Unity Government" he was appointed Minister for Culture for a short period before being discharged.

References

Living people
1960 births
Place of birth missing (living people)
Palestinian People's Party politicians
Members of the 2006 Palestinian Legislative Council
Government ministers of the Palestinian National Authority
Members of the Executive Committee of the Palestine Liberation Organization